The Bulb-and-potato aphid (Rhopalosiphoninus latysiphon) is a species of aphid. It is a true bug that feeds on tulip and gladiolus bulbs, potatoes, and the roots of a variety of different plant species. However, it is noted that these subspecies are possible synonyms.

Taxonomy
There are two described subspecies of R.latysiphon, being

 Rhopalosiphoninus latysiphon latysiphon
 Rhopalosiphoninus latysiphon panaxis
However, it is noted that these subspecies are possible synonyms.

References

External links
 Rhopalosiphoninus latysiphon at aphid.aphidnet.org
 onlinelibrary.wiley.com
 Rhopalosiphoninus (Rhopalosiphoninus) latysiphon at aphid.speciesfile.org
 Rhopalosiphoninus latysiphon at ADW
https://www.inaturalist.org/taxa/396380-Rhopalosiphoninus-latysiphon 

Macrosiphini
Agricultural pest insects
Insects described in 1912